A coupe or coupé is a passenger car with a sloping or truncated rear roofline and two doors.

The term coupé was first applied to horse-drawn carriages for two passengers without rear-facing seats. It comes from the French past participle of couper, "cut".



Etymology and pronunciation  
 is based on the past participle of the French verb  ("to cut") and thus indicates a car which has been "cut" or made shorter than standard. It was first applied to horse-drawn carriages for two passengers without rear-facing seats.

There are two common pronunciations in English:
  – the anglicized version of the French pronunciation of coupé.
  – as a spelling pronunciation when the word is written without an accent. This is the usual pronunciation and spelling in the United States, with the pronunciation entering American vernacular no later than 1936 and featuring in the Beach Boys' hit 1963 song "Little Deuce Coupe".

Definition 

A coupe is a fixed-roof car with a sloping rear roofline and one or two rows of seats. However, there is some debate surrounding whether a coupe must have two doors for passenger egress or whether cars with four doors can also be considered coupes. This debate has arisen since the early 2000s, when four-door cars such as the Mazda RX-8 and Mercedes-Benz CLS-Class have been marketed as "four-door coupes" or "quad coupes", although the Rover P5 was a much earlier example, with a variant introduced in 1962 having a lower, sleeker roofline marketed as the Rover P5 Coupé.

In the 1940s and 1950s, coupes were distinguished from sedans by their shorter roof area and sportier profile. Similarly, in more recent times, when a model is sold in both coupe and sedan body styles, generally the coupe is sportier and more compact.

The 1977 version of International Standard ISO3833—Road vehicles - Types - Terms and definitions—defines a coupe as having two doors (along with a fixed roof, usually with limited rear volume, at least two seats in at least one row and at least two side windows).

The definition of coupe started to blur when manufacturers began to produce cars with a 2+2 body style (which have a sleek, sloping roofline, two doors, and two functional seats up front, plus two small seats in the back).

Some manufacturers also blur the definition of a coupe by applying this description to models featuring a hatchback or a rear cargo area access door that opens upwards. Most often also featuring a fold-down back seat, the hatchback or liftback layout of these cars improves their practicality and cargo room.

Horse-drawn carriages 

The coupe body style originated from the berline horse-drawn carriage. The coupe version of the berline was introduced in the 18th century as a shortened ("cut") version with no rear-facing seat. Normally, a coupe had a fixed glass window in the front of the passenger compartment. The coupe was considered an ideal vehicle for women to use to go shopping or to make social visits.

History 
The early coupe automobile's passenger compartment followed in general conception the design of horse-drawn coupes, with the driver in the open at the front and an enclosure behind him for two passengers on one bench seat. The French variant for this word thus denoted a car with a small passenger compartment.

By the 1910s, the term had evolved to denote a two-door car with the driver and up to two passengers in an enclosure with a single bench seat. The coupé de ville, or coupe chauffeur, was an exception, retaining the open driver's section at front.

In 1916, the Society of Automobile Engineers suggested nomenclature for car bodies that included the following:

During the 20th century, the term coupe was applied to various close-coupled cars (where the rear seat that is located further forward than usual and the front seat further back than usual).

Since the 1960s the term coupe has generally referred to a two-door car with a fixed roof.

Since 2005, several models with four doors have been marketed as "four-door coupes", however reactions are mixed about whether these models are actually sedans instead of coupes. According to Edmunds, an American automotive guide, "the four-door coupe category doesn't really exist."

Variations

Berlinetta

A berlinetta is a lightweight sporty two-door car, typically with two-seats but also including 2+2 cars.

Club coupe
A club coupe is a two-door car with a larger rear-seat passenger area, compared with the smaller rear-seat area in a 2+2 body style.

Hardtop coupe
A hardtop coupe is a two-door car that lacks a structural pillar ("B" pillar) between the front and rear side windows. When these windows are lowered, the effect is like that of a convertible coupe with the windows down. The hardtop body style was popular in the United States from the early 1950s until the 1970s. It was also available in European and Japanese markets. Safety regulations for roof structures to protect passengers in a rollover were proposed, limiting development of new models. The hardtop body style went out of style with consumers while the automakers focused on cost reduction and increasing efficiencies.

Combi coupé

Saab used the term "combi coupé" for a car body similar to the liftback.

Business coupe
A two-door car with no rear seat or with a removable rear seat intended for traveling salespeople and other vendors carrying their wares with them. American manufacturers developed this style of a coupe in the late 1930s.

Four-door coupe / quad coupe 
A four-door fastback car with a coupe-like roofline at the rear. The low-roof design reduces back-seat passenger access and headroom. The designation was first used for the low-roof model of the 1962–1973 Rover P5, followed by the 1992–1996 Nissan Leopard / Infiniti J30. Recent examples include the 2005 Mercedes-Benz CLS, 2010 Audi A7 , Volkswagen Arteon, and 2012 BMW 6 Series Gran Coupe.

Similarly, several cars with one or two small rear doors for rear seat passenger egress and no B-pillar have been marketed as "quad coupes". For example, the 2003 Saturn Ion and 2003 Mazda RX-8.

Three-door coupe
Particularly popular in Europe, many cars are designed with coupe styling, but a three-door hatchback/liftback layout to improve practicality, including cars such as the Jaguar E-Type, Mitsubishi 3000GT, Datsun 240Z, Toyota Supra, Mazda RX-7, Alfa Romeo Brera, Ford/Mercury Cougar and Volkswagen Scirocco.

Opera coupe
A two-door designed for driving to the opera with easy access to the rear seats. Features sometimes included a folding front seat next to the driver or a compartment to store top hats.

Often they would have solid rear-quarter panels, with small, circular windows, to enable the occupants to see out without being seen. These opera windows were revived on many U.S. automobiles during the 1970s and early 1980s.

Three-window coupe
The three-window coupe (commonly just "three-window") is a style of automobile characterized by two side windows and a backlight (rear window). The front windscreens are not counted. The three-window coupe has a distinct difference from the five-window coupe, which has an additional window on each side behind the front doors. These two-door cars typically have small-sized bodies with only a front seat and an occasional small rear seat.

The style was popular from the 1920s until the beginning of World War II. While many manufacturers produced three-window coupes, the 1932 Ford coupe is often considered the classic hot rod.

Coupe SUV 

Some SUVs or crossovers with sloping rear rooflines are marketed as "coupe crossover SUVs" or "coupe SUVs", even though they have four side doors for passenger egress to the seats and rear hatches for cargo area access.

Positioning in model range 

In the United States, some coupes are "simply line-extenders two-door variants of family sedans", while others have significant differences to their four-door counterparts. 

The AMC Matador coupe (1974–1978) has a shorter wheelbase with a distinct aerodynamic design and fastback styling, sharing almost nothing with the conventional three-box design and more "conservative" four-door versions. 

Similarly, the Chrysler Sebring and Dodge Stratus coupes and sedans (late-1990 through 2000s), have little in common except their names. The coupes were engineered by Mitsubishi and built in Illinois, while the sedans were developed by Chrysler and built in Michigan. Some coupes may share platforms with contemporary sedans.

Coupes may also exist as model lines in their own right, either closely related to other models, but named differently – such as the Alfa Romeo GT or Infiniti Q60 – or have little engineering in common with other vehicles from the manufacturer – such as the Toyota GT86.

Gallery

See also

 Convertible
 Grand tourer

References

 
Car body styles
Carriages